Darius White (born 1992) is a wide receiver. He currently an undrafted free agent. White was a 2009 High School All-American by USA Today, Parade and EA Sports.

A native of Dallas, Texas, White attended Dunbar High School in Fort Worth, Texas, where he recorded 93 catches for 2,293 yards and 35 TDs and a punt return and kickoff return for a TD over his final three seasons. Regarded as a four-star recruit by Rivals.com, White was listed as the No. 6 wide receiver prospect in the class of 2010.

In December 2011, White elected to transfer from the University of Texas to the University of Missouri.

References

External links
Missouri Tigers bio 
Texas Longhorns bio

1992 births
Living people
People from Fort Worth, Texas
American football wide receivers
Texas Longhorns football players